Luciano Ángel De Bruno (born August 6, 1978) is an Argentine football offensive midfielder who is currently playing for Ñublense in the Primera División of Chile.

References
 
 
 
 
 Profile & Statistics at One.co.il 

1978 births
Living people
Footballers from Rosario, Santa Fe
Argentine footballers
Association football midfielders
Rosario Central footballers
Talleres de Córdoba footballers
Club Atlético Lanús footballers
Tiro Federal footballers
AEL Limassol players
Ñublense footballers
Hapoel Tel Aviv F.C. players
Chiapas F.C. footballers
Gimnasia y Esgrima de Jujuy footballers
Correcaminos UAT footballers
Argentine Primera División players
Israeli Premier League players
Liga MX players
Cypriot First Division players
Argentine expatriate footballers
Expatriate footballers in Chile
Expatriate footballers in Cyprus
Expatriate footballers in Israel
Expatriate footballers in Mexico
Expatriate footballers in Ecuador